Marcian most often refers to Flavius Marcianus, Eastern Roman emperor from 450 to 457 AD

Marcian (Marcianus) may also refer to:

 Saint Marcian of Tortona (died 120 AD)  
 Marcion of Sinope, 2nd century AD Christian heretic
 Marcian of Rhossos (fl. 2nd century), alleged author of the Gospel of Peter, may be the same as Marcion of Sinope
 Aelius Marcianus, 3rd century AD jurist 
 Lucius Aurelius Marcianus, 3rd century AD Roman soldier
 Marcian of Heraclea, 4th century AD geographer
 Marcianus (praefectus urbi), an urban prefect of Rome in 409 AD
 Marcian (usurper), tried to overthrow Emperor Zeno in 479 AD
 Marcian (cousin of Justin II), Byzantine general and cousin of Justin II
Marziano Lavarello ("Marziano II" or "Marcianus II"), 20th century AD Italian eccentric and pretender

See also
 Marcion
 Marsien